The Abandoned Field: Free Fire Zone is a 1979 Vietnamese drama film directed by . It won the Golden Prize and the Prix FIPRESCI at the 12th Moscow International Film Festival.

The film gives an "unnerving and compelling .. subjective-camera-eye-view" of life under helicopter fire in a free-fire zone in the Mekong Delta during the Vietnam War. The film cuts to an (American) "helicopter-eye view", contrasting painfully with the human tenderness seen earlier.

Plot
The film completely takes place within the perimeter of an empty field, but it exploits both the space under the water (from under the water surface of the field) and the edges of the sky (where there are American warplanes conducting raids).

The setting is the area of Dong Thap Muoi during the days of the Vietnam war. Ba Do, his wife and small child live in a small shack in the middle of the water. They are entrusted by the revolution with the mission of maintaining the lines of communication for the armed forces. The author focused much of the plot's development upon the daily life of the husband and wife, like planting rice, caring for their child, catching snakes, and catching fish, but interwoven with this are American military helicopters raiding the watery field to uncover the guerilla soldiers operating there. When Ba Do is shot by an American helicopter, his wife shoots the helicopter down in order to avenge him.

At the end of the film there is a scene where a photograph of the shot pilot's wife and child falls from his chest. There were many suggestions to edit this scene from the film, however, it was still kept in order for people to see and understand American soldiers more clearly, they also are normal people, with a wife and child like Ba Do, but because of the war they had to be pulled from their families and put into Vietnam to fight.

Cast
 Toi Lam as Ba Do
 Thuy An Nguyen as Sau Xoa
 De Xuan
 Chi Hong

References

External links
 

1979 films
1979 drama films
Vietnamese-language films
Vietnamese drama films
Vietnamese war films